{{DISPLAYTITLE:C17H26N4O}}
The molecular formula C17H26N4O (molar mass: 302.41 g/mol, exact mass: 302.2107 u) may refer to:

 Alniditan
 Emedastine

Molecular formulas